Lamya Matoub (born 18 January 1992) is a French-Algerian female karateka who generally competes in the kumite category. She has played in domestic level competitions in France representing Sarcelles club and shifted her focus to represent Algeria in international competitions. Lamya has claimed medals at various sport events including the World Karate Championships and in the World Games. On 26 August 2019, she claimed her second African Games medal in the 50kg kumite category during the 2019 African Games and couldn't able to defend her gold medal she claimed during the 2015 African Games.

Career 
She pursued her career in Algeria and represented Algeria internationally from 2015 and eventually represented Algeria at the 2015 African Games and claimed a gold medal in the women's kumite 68 kg event. At the 2017 World Games, she secured the gold medal in the women's kumite 68 kg event. 

She also became the champion in the 2018 African Karate Championships and was part of the Algerian team which claimed gold in the team event at the 2018 African Karate Championships. In July 2019, she bagged a silver medal in 68kg kumite event during the 2019 African Karate Championships.

Most notably, she also clinched a bronze medal at the 2018 World Karate Championships representing Algeria.  She also represented Algeria at the 2019 African Games and went onto claim bronze medal in the women's 68kg kumite event while her fellow compatriot Imane Taleb also claimed a bronze in 50kg women's kumite event.

In 2021, she competed at the World Olympic Qualification Tournament held in Paris, France, hoping to qualify for the 2020 Summer Olympics in Tokyo, Japan. She did not qualify at this tournament, but she was able to qualify via continental representation soon after. She competed in the women's +61 kg event.

Achievements

References

External links 
 
 

1992 births
Living people
Algerian female karateka
French female karateka
African Games medalists in karate
African Games gold medalists for Algeria
African Games bronze medalists for Algeria
Competitors at the 2019 African Games
Competitors at the 2015 African Games
Competitors at the 2017 World Games
World Games gold medalists
World Games medalists in karate
Karateka at the 2020 Summer Olympics
French sportspeople of Algerian descent
Olympic karateka of Algeria
20th-century Algerian women
21st-century Algerian women
20th-century French women
21st-century French women